Harriman State Park may refer to:

Harriman State Park (Idaho)
Harriman State Park (New York)